is a high school in Kanagawa-ku, Yokohama, Kanagawa Prefecture, Japan. It was founded in 1914. It is a part of the Kanagawa Prefectural Board of Education.

School 
The school is one of Kanagawa's prefectural high schools. The school provides a full-time and a part-time course. The school is co-educational, with 60% boys and 40% girls in the full-time course.

The school was established in 1914 as an "old system" junior high school.  The school was originally known as Kanagawa Prefectural Second Yokohama Junior High School. In 1950, the school became co-educational and changed its name to Kanagawa Prefectural Yokohama Suiran High School. Suiran means "the green air that envelops the mountains" and names the school song.

The school signed a sister school agreement with Eleanor Roosevelt High School of Greenbelt, Maryland, in 1989. As part of this agreement, the two schools have an exchange program. Students from each school spend up to a week at the other as part of school cultural exchange trips. Suiran students typically visit ERHS in March, and ERHS students typically visit Suiran in June.

Student life
Most students live in Kanagawa Prefecture, with a typical commuting time of 60 minutes.

The school operates on a semester system with a five-week summer vacation and a two-week break at the end of the year.

Notes and references

See also
Kanagawa Prefectural Board of Education

External links
Yokohama Suiran High School
Kanagawa Prefectural Board of Education

Educational institutions established in 1914
1914 establishments in Japan
High schools in Yokohama